Leiningen-Westerburg was a historic state of the Holy Roman Empire, located in the vicinity of Leiningen and Westerburg in what is now the German state of Rhineland-Palatinate.  

Leiningen-Westerburg was formed in 1467, when the last Landgrave of Leiningen died childless and Leiningen passed to his sister Margaret, who was married to Reinhard III of Westerburg.  Reinhard's grandson moved his capital to Leiningen in 1481 and began styling himself Reinhard I of Westerburg-Leiningen.

Rulers of Leiningen-Westerburg

See also 
 Barony of Westerburg
 County of Leiningen

Counties of the Holy Roman Empire
Leiningen family
States and territories established in 1467